Andrew or Andy Wood may refer to:

 Andrew Wood of Largo (died 1515), Scottish admiral
 Andrew Wood (bishop) (died 1695), Scottish prelate, Bishop of the Isles, 1678–1680, Bishop of Caithness, 1680–1688/9
 Andrew Wood (surgeon) (1810–1881), Scottish surgeon
 Andrew Trew Wood (1826–1903), Canadian businessman and parliamentarian
 Sir Andrew Wood (diplomat) (born 1940), British diplomat
 Andy Wood (historian) (born 1967), British social historian
 Andrew Wood (singer) (1966–1990), American lead singer of Mother Love Bone and Malfunkshun
 Andy Wood (comedian) (born 1977), American comedian and producer

See also
 Andrew Woods (disambiguation)